Just Neighbors is a 1919 American short comedy film featuring Harold Lloyd. Prints of the film survive in the film archives at George Eastman House, the UCLA Film and Television Archive, Filmoteca Española and the National Film, Television and Sound Archives of Canada.

Plot
Harold and Snub are friendly neighbors who have adjoining backyards.  Harold's good-natured attempt to help Snub build a chicken coop in his backyard leads a series of destructive mishaps.  They culminate in the two men fighting even though they are separated by a fence.  Their friendship is restored when Snub's toddler daughter, who has wandered into a busy street, is rescued.

Cast
 Harold Lloyd - The Boy
 Bebe Daniels - The Bride
 Snub Pollard - The Neighbor
 Sammy Brooks - Short man in bank (uncredited)
 Helen Gilmore - Old woman with packages (uncredited)
 Margaret Joslin - Neighbor's Wife (uncredited)
 Gus Leonard - Bearded bank teller / Vegetable vendor (uncredited)
 Gaylord Lloyd - Man in Line at Bank (uncredited)
 Marie Mosquini - (uncredited)
 Charles Stevenson - Postman (uncredited)
 Noah Young - (uncredited)

See also
 Harold Lloyd filmography

References

External links

1919 films
1919 short films
American silent short films
1919 comedy films
American black-and-white films
Films directed by Harold Lloyd
Silent American comedy films
American comedy short films
1910s American films
1910s English-language films